Frank Pergolizzi is an American college athletic administrator director and former American football coach. He is the athletic director at Husson College in Bangor, Maine, a position he has held since 2013. Pergolizzi served as the head football coach at Saint Francis University in Loretto, Pennsylvania from 1989 to 1994, compiling a record o 2 5–33–2. After retiring from coaching, he embarked on a career in collegiate sports administration, serving as the athletic director Saint Francis from 1995 to 1998, East Tennessee State University from 1998 to 2000, Southeastern Louisiana University from 2000 to 2007, and West Virginia University Institute of Technology from 2009 to 2013.

Head coaching record

References

Year of birth missing (living people)
Living people
East Tennessee State Buccaneers athletic directors
Husson Eagles athletic directors
Saint Francis Red Flash athletic directors
Saint Francis Red Flash football coaches
Southeastern Louisiana Lions and Lady Lions athletic directors
West Virginia Tech Golden Bears athletic directors
Western Michigan University alumni
Williams College alumni